Harris Francis Fletcher (23 October 1892 – July 1979) was an American academic, professor of English at the University of Illinois for 36 years from 1926 to 1962, an author, and a leading authority on the work of John Milton.

Early life
He was born in Ypsilanti, Michigan. Fletcher received his Ph.D. from the University of Michigan in 1925.

Career
Fletcher was Professor of English at the University of Illinois from 1926 to 1962, and Associate Dean of Liberal Arts and Sciences from 1931 to 1938. Fletcher played a major role in the establishment of the university's Rare Book and Special Collections Library, which now include the largest collection of the works of the poet John Milton in the United States. He died in Champaign, Illinois in 1979.

Selected publications
 John Milton's Complete Poetical Works (1943) 
 Milton's Semitic studies and some manifestations of them in his poetry
 Milton's rabbinical readings 
 The use of the Bible in Milton's prose 
 The intellectual Development of John Milton (two volumes, 1956, 1961)
 Contributions to a Milton bibliography, 1800–1930, being a list of addenda to Stevens's Reference guide to Milton

Personal life
On July 8, 1915, he married Mary Ellen Davis in Ypsilanti, Michigan. Mary Ellen Davis died of influenza in the flu pandemic October 20, 1918. On 22 June 1922, he married Dorothy Bacon in Coldwater, Michigan.

References

External links
 Harris F. Fletcher Papers, University of Illinois Archives

1892 births
1979 deaths
People from Ypsilanti, Michigan
People from Champaign, Illinois
University of Michigan alumni
University of Illinois Urbana-Champaign faculty
20th-century American non-fiction writers